Aḥmad ibn Muḥammad ibn ʿAjība al-Ḥasanī (1747–1809) was an influential 18th-century Moroccan scholar and poet in the Darqawa Sufi Sunni Islamic lineage.

Biography
He was born of a sharif family in the Anjra tribe that ranges from Tangiers to Tetuan along the Mediterranean coast of Morocco. As a child he developed a love of knowledge, memorizing the Qur'an and studying subjects ranging from Classical Arabic grammar, religious ethics, poetry, Qur'anic recitation and tafsir. When he reached the age of eighteen he left home and undertook the study of exoteric knowledge in Qasr al-Kabir under the supervision of Sidi Muhammad al-Susi al-Samlali. It was here that he was introduced to studies in the sciences, art, philosophy, law and Qur'anic exegesis in depth. He went to Fes to study with Mohammed al-Tawudi ibn Suda, Bennani, and El-Warzazi, and joined the new Darqawiyya in 1208 AH (1793), of which he was the representative in the northern part of the Jbala region. He spent nearly his entire life in and around Tetuan, and died of the plague in 1224 AH (1809). He is the author of over thirty works, including an autobiography, al-Fahrasa, which provides interesting information concerning the intellectual center that Tetuan had become by the beginning of the 19th century.

Works 
 The Immense Ocean: Al-Bahr Al-Madid: A Thirteenth Century Quranic Commentary on the Chapters of the All-Merciful, the Event, and Iron (Fons Vitae, Quranic Commentaries) 2009.

 The Book of Ascension: Looking into the Essential Truths of Sufism (Mi'raj al-tashawwuf ila haqa'iq al-tasawwuf), A Lexicon of Sufic Terminology by Ahmad ibn 'Ajiba, Mohamed Fouad Aresmouk (Translator), Michael Abdurrahman Fitzgerald (Translator). Fons Vitae 2012; .

 Al-ʿumda fī sharḥ al-burda, ed. ʿAbd al-Salām al-ʿImrānī al-Khālidī, Beirut: Dār al-Kutub al-ʿIlmiyya, 2011.

 Al-durar al-mutanāthira fī tawjīh al-qirāʾāt al-mutawātira, ed. ʿAbd al-Salām al-ʿImrānī al-Khālidī, Beirut: Dār al-Kutub al-ʿIlmiyya, 2013.

 Īqāẓ al-himam fī sharḥ al-ḥikam, ed. Muḥammad Aḥmad Ḥasab Allāh, Cairo: Dār al-Maʿārif, 1983.

 Autobiography: Aḥmad Ibn ʿAjība, Fahrasat al-ʿālim al-rabbānī Sayyidī Aḥmad Ibn Muḥammad Ibn ʿAjība al-Ḥasanī, ed. ʿAbd al-Salām al-ʿImrānī al-Khālidī, Beirut: Dār al-Kutub al-ʿIlmiyya, 2013.
 The Autobiography (Fahrasa) of a Moroccan Soufi: Ahmad ibn 'Ajiba, translated from the Arabic by Jean-Louis Michon and David Streight, Fons Vitae, Louisville KY USA,1999 
 Jean-Louis Michon: Autobiography of a Moroccan Sufi: Ahmad Ibn 'Ajiba [1747–1809]. 2000;

Sources 

 Jean-Louis Michon: Le soufi marocain Ah̥mad Ibn 'Ajība (1746–1809) et son "Mi'rāj" (glossaire de la mystique musulmane). Paris : J. Vrin, 1990 (Etudes musulmanes, 14) (Review (1) (2) / Kat.).
 Florian A.G. Lützen: Sufitum und Theologie bei Aḥmad Ibn ʿAǧība – Eine Studie zur Methode des Religionsbegriffs, Tübingen: Mohr Siebeck, 2020.
 Ḥasan ʿAzzūzī: Al-Shaykh Aḥmad Ibn ʿAjība wa manhajuhū fī al-tafsīr, 2 vols., Rabat: Maṭbaʿat Faḍāla, 2001.
 Mahmut Ay: Ahmed b. Acîbe ve işârî tefsir açisindan „El-Bahru‘l-Medîd“, PhD, University of Marmara, Istanbul, 2010.
 Nūr al-dīn Nās al-Faqīh: Aḥmad Ibn ʿAjība – Shāʿir al-taṣawwuf al-Maġribī, Beirut: Books-Publisher, 2013.

See also 
 Abu al-Hasan al-Shadhili
 Muhammad al-Arabi al-Darqawi
 Ibn 'Ata' Allah al-Sakandari
 Ibn al-Banna' al-Marrakushi
 Jean-Louis Michon
 List of Sufis
 List of Ash'aris and Maturidis

External links 
 His page on Goodreads

Asharis
Sunni Muslim scholars of Islam
Sunni imams
Sunni Sufis
Darqawi
Shadhili order
Mujaddid
Quranic exegesis scholars
Moroccan Maliki scholars
Moroccan autobiographers
Moroccan Sufi writers
People from Tangier
People from Tétouan
18th-century Moroccan people
19th-century Moroccan people
1747 births
1809 deaths